Heinrich Johann Nepomuk von Crantz (Roodt-sur-Eisch, Luxembourg, 25 November 1722 – 18 January 1799, Judenburg, Austria) was a botanist and a physician.

In 1750 he obtained his doctorate of medicine in Vienna, where he was a pupil of Gerard van Swieten (1700–1772). He studied obstetrics in Paris and London. In Paris he was influenced by André Levret (1703–1780) and Nicolas Puzos (1686–1753).

He was first married to Anna Susanne Petrasch and then to Magda Lena de Tremon. He had two sons and one daughter.

He became a lecturer in obstetrics at St. Mary's Hospital in Vienna in 1754. From 1756 to 1774, he taught physiology and materia medica at the university in that city.

He was the author of:
 Einleitung in eine wahre und gegründete Hebammenkunst (1756).
 Commentarius de rupto in partus doloribus a foetu utero (1756).
 Commentatio de instrumentorum in arte obstetricia historia utilitate et recta ac praepostera applicatione (1757).
 De systemate irritabilitatis (1761).
 Materia medica et chirurgica (three volumes, 1762) (Vol. 1 - 3 1765 Digital edition by the University and State Library Düsseldorf)
 De aquis medicatis principatus Transsylvaniae (1773).
 Die Gesundbrunnen der Österreichischen Monarchie (1777).

He recommended better methods of hygiene for midwives. In addition to his work in medicine, he studied  chemistry, botany, and the sources of mineral water.
The plant genus Crantzia (Gesneriaceae) was named for him by Thomas Nuttall.

References

1722 births
1797 deaths
18th-century Austrian physicians
18th-century Austrian botanists
Edlers of Austria
Alumni of the Athénée de Luxembourg
Austrian people of Luxembourgian descent
University of Vienna alumni